Felten's vole (Microtus felteni) is a species of rodent in the family Cricetidae.
It is found in Albania, Greece, North Macedonia, and Serbia.

References

Microtus
Mammals described in 1963
Taxonomy articles created by Polbot